BGFC may refer to:

Bangkok Glass F.C.
Blue Guards F.C.